The 376th Air Expeditionary Wing (376 AEW) is an inactive wing of the United States Air Force. It was last stationed at the Transit Center at Manas International Airport, Kyrgyz Republic, supporting U.S. and ISAF operations in Afghanistan.

During the Vietnam War, the 376th Strategic Wing was a Strategic Air Command unit activated to perpetuate the lineage of inactive World War II bombardment units with illustrious records. It performed strategic bombing and air refueling missions over Southeast Asia with deployed elements from wings in the United States. From 1973 until the end of the Cold War it performed air refueling of Pacific Air Forces tactical and Military Airlift Command transport aircraft in the Theater as well as performing strategic reconnaissance operations.  It was inactivated as part of the drawdown of USAF strategic forces in 1991.

Mission
The 376th Expeditionary Wing is responsible for providing air combat power projection throughout the CENTCOM Area of Responsibility, including tactical airlift and air refueling, principally in support of OPERATION ENDURING FREEDOM. C-17, KC-135, and C-5 aircraft are involved in this effort. Additionally, the wing serves as a hub for strategic airlift operations and as an intermediate staging base for transiting personnel and equipment in support of operations in Afghanistan. The wing hosts transient forces from coalition nations, as well as transient forces of the United States Army, Marine Corps and Navy.

Units

 376th Expeditionary Operations Group
 The 376 EOG is the lead KC-135 aerial refueling unit for Afghanistan operations. Other USAF aircraft supporting the mission include KC-135s and C-17s.
 376th Expeditionary Maintenance Group
 376th Medical Group
 376th Expeditionary Mission Support Group

History
The 376th Air Expeditionary Wing is authorized to display the honors earned by the 376 Expeditionary
Operations Group before 1 June 1951, however the lineage and history of the units are separate prior to that date.

World War II

The wing's operations group, as the 376th Bombardment Group (Heavy) was the first B-24 Liberator group to be based on European Continent. It engaged in combat with the Ninth, Twelfth and Fifteenth Air Forces in the Egypt-Libya and Italian Campaigns. the 376th was awarded Distinguished Unit Citations: for operations over North Africa and Sicily, November 1942-17 August 1943; Ploesti, Romania, 1 August 1943 and Bratislava, Czechoslovakia, 16 June 1944. The B-24 "Lady Be Good" was from the 514th Bomb Squadron.

Cold War

The 376th Bombardment Wing, Medium, was established on 25 May 1951, and activated at Forbes Air Force Base, Kansas on 1 June 1951. The wing was initially equipped with B-29s and trained in strategic bombardment operations. Replaced the propeller-driven B-29s with new B-47E Stratojet swept-wing medium bombers in 1954, capable of flying at high subsonic speeds and primarily designed for penetrating the airspace of the Soviet Union. The wing gained the 376th AREFS, equipped with KC-97 Stratofreighters, on 18 August 1953.

Moved to Lockbourne AFB, Ohio in 1957, and continued to fly numerous training missions and participated in various SAC exercises and deployments with the Stratojet. Beginning in September 1957, the wing began engaging in Electronic countermeasures operations, which became the wing's primary mission. Included EB-47L Stratojet post attack command and control operations, December 1962 – February 1965.

In the early 1960s, the B-47 was considered to be reaching obsolescence, and was being phased out of SAC's strategic arsenal. Began to send the wing's aircraft to Davis–Monthan AFB in 1964. The unit was inactivated at Lockbourne AFB, Ohio, on 15 March 1965 as part of the phaseout of the B-47 from the USAF inventory.

376th Strategic Wing

The origins of the wing's period as the 376th Strategic Wing came when SAC established the 4252d Strategic Wing (SW) at Kadena Air Base, Okinawa on 12 January 1965 and assigned it to the 3d Air Division. The 4252d SW was a SAC Major Command controlled (MAJCON) unit with the mission to support SAC's Boeing B-52 Stratofortress aircraft (B-52Ds and B-52Fs) and KC-135 Stratotankers from SAC Continental United States bases engaged in combat operations over Southeast Asia from Kadena on a daily basis during the Vietnam War.  It was initially assigned a single maintenance squadron, but before the end of the year had three squadrons assigned.

The 4252d equipment consisted of about 110 KC-135 Tankers that refueled tactical fighters over the South China Sea and Gulf of Tonkin that were carrying out attacks on North Vietnam. In addition the aircraft would evacuate personnel to other Pacific bases when typhoons threatened Okinawa while flying scheduled aerial refueling missions.

In early 1968, the wing mission expanded to include aerial reconnaissance, when the 82d Strategic Reconnaissance Squadron (SRS) was assigned to the wing.  On 21 August 1968, the 4252d Munitions Maintenance Squadron was activated to oversee the wing's munitions in anticipation of the addition of B-52s to the wing's aircraft.  The B-52s conducted Arc Light strategic bombardment missions over North Viet Nam, refueling from the tankers on their return trip to Kadena.

On 19 November 1968, a B-52 from the wing crashed at Kadena.

In 1970, Headquarters SAC received authority from Headquarters USAF to discontinue the 4252d SW, which was equipped with combat aircraft, and to activate an Air Force controlled (AFCON) unit which could carry a lineage and history. On 1 April 1970, the 4252d was replaced by the 376th, which had been redesignated the 376th Strategic Wing.  The 82d SRS was transferred to the 376th, while the 4252d's maintenance squadrons were replaced by ones with the 376th numerical designation of the new wing. Each of the new units assumed the personnel, equipment, and mission of its predecessor.

The rotational B-52 elements were shifted to the 307th Strategic Wing at U-Tapao Royal Thai Navy Airfield, Thailand soon afterward. Using aircraft and crews deployed from CONUS-based SAC wings, the 376th SW controlled the 909th Air Refueling Squadron (KC-135A/Q/R) and supported rotational reconnaissance aircraft (TR-1, SR-71). It conducted airborne radio relay operations, April–November 1970; February–June 1971 and March 1972 – August 1973. The Wing was inactivated at Kadena on 30 October 1991 with the drawdown of strategic forces after the end of the Cold War. Its mission was absorbed by the host 18th Wing.

War in Afghanistan 
Manas air base operations began 16 December 2001 and included the 86th Contingency Response Group from Ramstein Air Base, Germany as well as contractors and French engineers. Since then it has hosted forces from Australia, Denmark, France, Italy, New Zealand, Norway, South Korea, Spain and the Netherlands. Coalition aircraft previously based here have included tankers (KC-135s), tactical airlift (C-130s), fighters (F-18, F-16, Mirage 2000) and helicopters (Super Puma).

In February 2009, the Kyrgyz Parliament voted to close the base after the two governments failed to agree on a higher rent for the property. American and Kyrgyz officials continued negotiations after the announcement, and on 23 June a tentative agreement was reached. Under the new arrangement, the United States will pay $200 million, three times the previous rent, for continued use of the facilities. Before the handover to the Kyrgyz military, Kyrgyz forces handled security in the areas surrounding the facility, while American forces provided security for the facility, and the site was then called a "transit center" instead of an "air base".

After Russian pressure on Kyrgyzstan, increased rent payments, and renewed pressure to leave, the United States removed its forces from the base in 2014 and the wing was inactivated.

Lineage
 Constituted as the 376th Bombardment Wing (Medium) on 25 May 1951
 Activated on 1 June 1951
 Discontinued and inactivated on 15 March 1965.
 Redesignated 376th Strategic Wing on 23 January 1970
 Activated on 1 April 1970
 Inactivated 30 October 1991
 Redesignated 376th Air Expeditionary Wing and converted to provisional status, on 4 December 2001
 Inactivated on 3 June 2014

Assignments
 4th Air Division, 1 June 1951
 Attached to 21st Air Division, 1 June-10 October 1951
 801st Air Division, 3 December 1951 – 15 March 1965
 Eighth Air Force, 1 April 1970
 3d Air Division, 1 January 1975 – 1 October 1991
 Air Combat Command to activate or inactivate at any time after 4 December 2001.

Components
Groups
 376th Bombardment Group (later 376th Expeditionary Operations Group): 1 June 1951 – 16 June 1952 (not operational), 4 Dec 2001–present

Squadrons
 65th Strategic Squadron: 1 July 1990 – 2 October 1991
 82d Strategic Reconnaissance Squadron: 1 April 1970 – 30 September 1976
 91st Air Refueling Squadron: 1 December 1957 – 15 June 1964
 376th Air Refueling Squadron: 18 August 1953 – 1 December 1957
 512th Bombardment Squadron: attached 1 June 1951 – 15 June 1952, assigned 16 June 1952 – 15 March 1965
 513th Bombardment Squadron: attached 1 June 1951 – 15 June 1952, assigned 16 June 1952 – 15 March 1965
 514th Bombardment Squadron: attached 1 June 1951 – 15 June 1952, assigned 16 June 1952 – 15 March 1965
 514th Bombardment Squadron: 1 December 1958 – 1 January 1962
 909th Air Refueling Squadron: 1 July 1971 – 1 October 1991 (detached 5 November 1990 – 15 March 1991)
 4102d Air Refueling Squadron, Provisional: attached 6 June-8 November 1972; attached 18 December 1972 – 22 January 1973
 4180th Bombardment Squadron: 1 April – 1 July 1970 (not operational)
 4220th Air Refueling Squadron: 1 April 1970 – 31 January 1971
 4363d Support (later, 4363d Post Attack Command and Control) Squadron: attached 20 July 1962 – 15 February 1965

Stations
376th Air Expeditionary Wing
 Forbes AFB, Kansas, 1 June 1951
 Barksdale AFB, Louisiana, 10 October 1951
 Lockbourne AFB, Ohio, 1 December 1957 – 15 March 1965
 Kadena AB, Okinawa, Japan, 1 April 1970 – 1 October 1991.
 Transit Center at Manas, Kyrgyz Republic, 4 December 2001 – 6 June 2014

Aircraft
 B-29 Superfortress, 1951–1954
 B/E/EB-47 Stratojet, 1954–1965
 E-47 Stratojet, 1958–1961
 KC-97 Stratofreighter, 1953–1963
 KC-135 Stratotanker, 1963–1964; 1970–1991
 B-52D Stratofortress, 1970
 RC-135, 1970–1991

See also

 List of B-29 Superfortress operators
 List of B-47 units of the United States Air Force
 List of B-52 Units of the United States Air Force

References

Notes

 376th AEW Pamphlet

Bibliography
 Byers, Richard G. Attack: Death in the Skies Over the Middle East. Winona, Minnesota: Apollo Books, 1984.
 McClendon, Dennis E. The Lady Be Good: Mystery Bomber of World War II. Fallbrook, California: Aero Publishers, Inc., 1962 (2nd edition 1982).
 
 Rogers, B. United States Air Force Unit Designations Since 1978. 2006. .
 Uncredited. 200th Mission, Liberator-Athens-Tatos A/D 14 December 1943. APO 681, Italy: 376th Bomb Grp.,1943.
 Uncredited. A Short History of the 376th Bombardment Group, 20 May 1942 – 22 February 1945. N.p. 1945.
 "US Air Force Air Power Directory" World Airpower Journal. London: Aerospace Publishing, 1992. .
 Walker, James W. The Liberandos: A World War II History of the 376th Bomb Group (H) and Its Founding Units. Waco, Texas: 376th Heavy Bombardment Group Association, 1994.
 Johnson, David C. (1988), U.S. Army Air Forces Continental Airfields (ETO), D-Day to V-E Day; Research Division, USAF Historical Research Center, Maxwell AFB, Alabama.

External links

 376th Heavy Bombardment Group, Inc. Veterans Association
 376th Mission History
 Joe's USAF Blue Book
 376th Heavy Bombardment Group Oral Histories, a digital collection of audio and video oral histories with veterans serving in the 376th Heavy Bombardment Group during World War II

0376